Jiří Hujer (born 18 January 1941) is a Czech luger. He competed in the men's singles and doubles events at the 1964 Winter Olympics.

References

External links
 

1941 births
Living people
Czech male lugers
Olympic lugers of Czechoslovakia
Lugers at the 1964 Winter Olympics